Zelienople Municipal Airport  is a public airport in Beaver County, Pennsylvania, a mile west of Zelienople, a borough in Butler County, Pennsylvania, in the Pittsburgh metropolitan area. The airport is owned by the Borough of Zelienople and operated by the Zelienople Municipal Authority. The National Plan of Integrated Airport Systems for 2011–2015 categorized it as a general aviation facility.

It serves the community of Zelienople in Butler County, but the airport is over the county line in Beaver County, in Fombell, Pennsylvania, Franklin Township.

Fire response consists of 2 Engines, 1 Tanker, 1 Brush Truck, 1 Squad, and Command Vehicle. The airport is between PA 288 and PA 588.  The airport began service in 1958, and is one of many medium-sized airports north of Pittsburgh.

Most U.S. airports use the same three-letter location identifier for the Federal Aviation Administration and IATA, but this airport is PJC to the FAA and has no IATA code. (IATA assigned PJC to Pedro Juan Caballero Airport in Pedro Juan Caballero, Paraguay.

Facilities
The airport covers 291 acres (118 ha) at an elevation of 898 feet (274 m). Its one runway, 17/35, is 4,933 by 75 feet (1,504 x 23 m) asphalt.

In the year ending August 22, 2011 the airport had 27,789 aircraft operations, average 76 per day: 94% general aviation and 6% air taxi. 35 aircraft were then based at this airport: 71% single-engine, 11% multi-engine, 11% jet, and 6% helicopter.

References

External links 
 Airport page at Borough of Zelienople website
 Pittsburgh Jet Center, the fixed-base operator
 Aerial image as of April 1993 from USGS The National Map
 

Airports in Pennsylvania
Transportation buildings and structures in Beaver County, Pennsylvania